Submotion Orchestra are a seven piece band formed in 2009 in Leeds, Yorkshire, England. They are influenced by dubstep, soul, ambient electronica, jazz and dub.

Their debut LP Finest Hour was released on Ranking Records. They have performed all over the UK and Europe including Festival shows at The Big Chill, Latitude, Outlook and Bestival, and in Thailand at Wonderfruit. They have since released five full-length albums - Finest Hour (2011), Fragments (2012), Alium (2014), Colour Theory (2016), Kites (2018) - and two EPs - 1968 (2013) and III (2015).

References

External links
 Submotion Orchestra - Home
 Submotion Orchestra - New Songs, Playlists & Latest News - BBC Music 
 Submotion Orchestra - MusicBrainz 
 BBC Radio 2 - Radio 2 In Concert, Beverley Knight, Submotion Orchestra - Interview with Jo Whiley and Trevor Nelson
 BBC - Music - Review of Submotion Orchestra - Finest Hour

Musical groups from Leeds
English electronic music groups
Counter Records artists